The Global Creative Leadership Summit is an annual gathering of around 120 leading figures in the areas of science, technology, culture, business and government. It mainly focuses on global poverty, health, wealth, and where they cross. It opens with a series of keynote speeches addressing the threats and opportunities of globalization. Over the following two days, delegates discuss global issues.

External links
 https://web.archive.org/web/20131005020313/http://www.tucsonnewsnow.com/story/11176945/global-creative-leadership-summit-to-address-the-challenges-and-opportunities-of-globalization
International conferences in the United States